Amilcar Adulai Djau Codjovi (born 22 February 2002) is a Spanish professional footballer who plays as a midfielder for Ayia Napa.

Career
Born in Spain to parents from Ivory Coast and Guinea-Bissau, Codjovi is a product of the Rayo Vallecano and Morecambe from Morecambe, Lancashire, England youth sportive systems.

After the long trial period, in January 2021, he signed contract with the Ukrainian Premier League club Vorskla Poltava and played for this club in the Ukrainian Premier League Reserves. Codjovi made his debut for Vorskla in the Ukrainian Premier League as a second half-time substituted player in the winning home match against FC Inhulets Petrove on 2 October 2021.

References

External links 
 

2002 births
Living people
Spanish footballers
Association football midfielders
Morecambe F.C. players
FC Vorskla Poltava players
Ayia Napa FC players
Ukrainian Premier League players
Spanish expatriate footballers
Spanish expatriate sportspeople in England
Expatriate footballers in England
Spanish expatriate sportspeople in Ukraine
Expatriate footballers in Ukraine
Spanish people of Ivorian descent
Spanish sportspeople of African descent
Spanish people of Bissau-Guinean descent